Raivo is the second EP by Finnish rock band CMX. It is seen as their heaviest, most aggressive hardcore recording. One song, "Hiki", made it to their 1997 compilation album Cloaca Maxima. The Raivo EP, along with Johannes Kastaja, is included on the 2002 re-release Kolmikärki Gold.

Track listing 
All songs by A. W. Yrjänä.
"Lintu"—2:10
"Rituaali"—0:54
"Syvä vesi"—0:48
"Jumalan ruoska"—1:01
"Raivo"—1:23
"Hiki"—2:04
"Kolme näkyä"—1:16
"Anathema"—1:15
"Maailmoiden välissä"—1:57

Personnel 
A. W. Yrjänä -- vocals, bass
Kimmo Suomalainen -- guitar
Pekka Kanniainen -- drums

Notes 

CMX (band) albums
1989 EPs